European Parliament elections were held in France on 12 June 1994. Six lists were able to win seats: an alliance of the centre-right Union for French Democracy and the Gaullist Rally for the Republic, the Socialist Party, the Left Radical Party, the French Communist Party, the National Front and Philippe de Villiers' eurosceptic right-wing dissident UDF list, which formed the Majorité pour l'autre Europe.  53.5% of the French population turned out on election day, actually an improvement on the last election in 1989. The Greens, who were weakened by an Ecology Generation list led by Brice Lalonde (winning 2.01%) and also suffering from internal divisions between the party's left (who wanted an electoral alliance with the Soécialists and the left) and the right (rejecting all alliances), lost all 9 seats won in 1989. Arlette Laguiller's Trotskyst Workers' Struggle (2.27%), Jean-Pierre Chevènement's left-wing eurosceptic Citizens' Movement (2.54%), the L'Europe commence à Sarajevo List (1.57%) and the agrarian populist Hunting, Fishing, Nature, Traditions (3.96%) were among the notable lists which did not pass the 5% threshold.

With 14.49%, the Socialists, the party of President François Mitterrand, whose list was led by Michel Rocard suffered its worst result ever in a European election, losing votes mainly to the Radical list led by wealthy businessman and a protégé of Mitterrand, Bernard Tapie. Most analysts agreed that Mitterrand supported Tapie's list behind the scenes, since Rocard was a personal rival of Mitterrand and he wished to destroy Rocard's chances in the 1995 presidential election. In fact, Rocard resigned as First Secretary of the PS shortly thereafter and did not run in 1995 – Lionel Jospin was the Socialist candidate.

The other surprise was Philippe de Villiers success. Villiers, the President of the General Council of Vendée, was a eurosceptic member of the liberal component (PR) of the pro-European UDF.  He won a surprisingly strong 12.34%, and his thirteen MEPs formed the nucleus of the Europe of Nations group.  However, his success did not lead him to immediate political successes – he polled barely 4% in the 1995 presidential election.

Results

Members elected

UDF – RPR 
Dominique Baudis
Hélène Carrère d'Encausse
Yves Galland
Christian Jacob
Jean-Pierre Raffarin
Armelle Guinebertiére
Nicole Fontaine
Alain Pompidou
Yves Verwaerde
Marie-Thérèse Hermange
Jean-Louis Bourlanges
Jacques Donnay
Françoise Grossetête
Blaise Aldo
Robert Hersant
Anne-Marie Schaffner
Francis Decourrière
Christian Cabrol
Bernard Stasi
Jean-Claude Pasty
André Soulier
Jean-Pierre Bazin
Pierre Bernard-Reymond
Raymond Chesa
Georges de Brémond d'Ars
Jean Baggioni
Jean-Pierre Bebear
Gérard d'Aboville

PS 
Michel Rocard
Catherine Trautmann
Bernard Kouchner
Danielle Darras
André Laignel
Nicole Pery
Jack Lang
Frédérique Bredin
Pierre Moscovici
Élisabeth Guigou
Jean-Pierre Cot
Pervenche Berès
François Bernardini
Michèle Lindeperg
Gérard Caudron

UDF dissidents 
Philippe de Villiers
James Goldsmith
Charles de Gaulle
Thierry Jean-Pierre
Philippe-Armand Martin
Françoise Seillier
Georges Berthu
Hervé Fabre-Aubrespy
Dominique Souchet
Anne Christine Poisson
Frédéric Striby
Edouard Des Places
Marie-France de Rose

PRG 
Bernard Tapie
Jean-François Hory
Catherine Lalumière
Christiane Taubira-Delannon
Noël Mamère
Michel Dary
André Sainjon
Bernard Castagnède
Odile Leperre-Verrier
Pierre Pradier
Christine Barthet-Mayer
Dominique Saint-Pierre
Antoinette Fouque

FN 
Jean-Marie Le Pen
Bruno Mégret
Bruno Gollnisch
Jean-Claude Martinez
Carl Lang
Marie-France Stirbois
Bernard Antony
Yvan Blot
Jean-Marie Le Chevallier
Fernand Le Rachinel
Jean-Yves Le Gallou

PCF 
Francis Wurtz
Sylviane Ainardi
Philippe Herzog
Gisèle Moreau
René Piquet
Mireille Elmalan
Aline Pailler

References

France
European Parliament elections in France
Europe